Mexican Water is an unincorporated community in Apache County, Arizona, United States. It is also approximately four miles east of Tes Nez Iah.

History 
A trading post was established at this site in 1907 under the name Nokaita.  It is believed that the current name came from wells that have since disappeared. On July 1, 1939, a bridge was completed 3 miles (4.8 km) west of the site because erosion had made the river crossing impassable.

References

Unincorporated communities in Apache County, Arizona
Populated places established in 1907
1907 establishments in Arizona Territory
Populated places on the Navajo Nation
Unincorporated communities in Arizona